Marcelo Arévalo and Sergio Galdós were the defending champions, but only Arévalo decided to defend his title, partnering Darian King. Arévalo lost in the quarterfinals to Alejandro Falla and Eduardo Struvay.

Alejandro Falla and Eduardo Struvay won the title after defeating Gonzalo Escobar and Roberto Quiroz 6–4, 7–5 in the final.

Seeds

Draw

References
 Main Draw

Claro Open Barranquilla - Doubles